Mateusz Siebert (born 4 April 1989 in Poznań) is a Polish professional footballer who plays as a centre-back for US Rumelange in Luxembourg National Division.

Career

Club
Born in Poland, he moved to France with his family at the age of three. His father Bernard is a former professional Polish footballer and his mother Renata a former handball player. He made his Ligue 2 debut in October 2008, coming on as a 25th-minute substitute against LB Châteauroux. In July 2009 he joined Arka Gdynia on a one-year loan with a buy option. His season ended in March as a result of injury. Despite wishing to retain him, the small club did not take up the buy option due to cost.

In February 2011, he joined Arka Gdynia on two and a half year contract.

International
Siebert was a part of the Poland U-21 team.

References

External links 
 

1989 births
Living people
Footballers from Poznań
Poland under-21 international footballers
Poland youth international footballers
Polish emigrants to France
Association football central defenders
FC Metz players
Arka Gdynia players
US Rumelange players
Ligue 2 players
Ekstraklasa players
I liga players
Luxembourg National Division players
Polish footballers
Polish expatriate footballers
Expatriate footballers in France
Polish expatriate sportspeople in France
Expatriate footballers in Luxembourg